Alexandra Jones may refer to:

C. Alexandra Jones, character played by J. A. Steel
Alexandra Jones; see HALO 8 Entertainment
Alexandra (Nikita character), alias Alexandra Jones
 Alexandra Jones (archaeologist)

See also
Alex Jones (disambiguation)